Lisa Azuelos (born Elise-Anne Bethsabée Azuelos; 6 November 1965 in Neuilly-sur-Seine) is a French director, writer, and producer. She is the daughter of singer Marie Laforêt.

Biography

Lisa Azuelos is the daughter of French singer and actress Marie Laforêt and of Judas Azuelos, a Moroccan Jew of Sephardic descent. 
She has a younger brother and a step-sister, Deborah. 

Her parents separated when she was 2 years old. Her mother kept her and sent her with her brother to a Swiss boarding school, "Les Sept Nains", where children were allegedly maltreated physically and mentally. Afterwards the two siblings were sent to live with someone in a small village in the department of Sarthe.

She stayed with her father since the age of twelve. That is the time she discovered his Sephardic heritage. 

 Lisa Azuelos was introduced to her future husband, film producer Patrick Alessandrin, by Luc Besson. The couple has three children, Carmen, Illan and Thaïs. They divorced after 11 years of marriage.

Lisa Azuelos has a film production company, which she named Bethsabée Mucho after her paternal great-grandmother Bethsabée.

Filmography

References

External links
 

1965 births
French women film directors
French film producers
Living people
20th-century Moroccan Jews
French people of Moroccan descent
French women screenwriters
French screenwriters
People from Neuilly-sur-Seine
French women film producers